Adam and Eve is the name of two works by German Renaissance artist Albrecht Dürer: an engraving made in 1504, and a pair of oil-on-panel paintings completed in 1507.

The engraving of 1504 depicts Adam and Eve in a scene together, with several symbolical animals around them. According to Erwin Panofsky, a mountain ash behind Adam represents the tree of life; the parrot on its branch represents wisdom. A fig tree stands in for the tree of the knowledge of good and evil. Four animals, a cat, elk, rabbit, and ox represent the four humours: cruelty, melancholy, sensuality, and lethargy, respectively. Additionally, the relationship of the mouse and feline at the feet of the figures parallels that of Adam and Eve.

The 1507 painting offered Dürer the opportunity to depict the ideal human figure. Painted in Nuremberg soon after his return from Venice, the panels were influenced by Italian art. Dürer's observations on his second trip to Italy provided him with new approaches to portraying the human form. Here, he depicts the figures at human scale—the first full-scale nude subjects in German painting.

Adam and Eve's first home was the Prague Castle, the property of collector Rudolf II. During the Thirty Years' War, armies plundered the castle and the panels came to be owned by Gustavus Adolphus of Sweden. His daughter, Christina, gave the work to Philip IV of Spain in 1654. Later King Charles III ordered in 1777 that the painting be hidden in the Real Academia de Bellas Artes de San Fernando, and it only avoided destruction, due to the king's view that it was obscene, by the intervention of his court painter. It arrived at its current home, Madrid's Museo del Prado, in 1827, but was not publicly displayed until 1833.

See also
Adam and Eve (Lucas Cranach the Elder)

References

Nürnberg, Verlag Hans Carl. Dürer in Dublin: Engravings and woodcuts of Albrecht Dürer. Chester Beatty Library, 1983

Further reading
Hart, Vaughan. 'Navel Gazing. On Albrecht Dürer's Adam and Eve (1504)', The International Journal of Arts Theory and History, 2016, vol.12.1 pp. 1–10  https://doi.org/10.18848/2326-9960/CGP/v12i01/1-10

External links

Paintings by Albrecht Dürer
1507 paintings
Diptychs
Paintings of the Museo del Prado by German artists
Durer

Nude art
Snakes in art